In the field of computer vision, velocity moments are weighted averages of the intensities of pixels in a sequence of images, similar to image moments but in addition to describing an object's shape also describe its motion through the sequence of images. Velocity moments can be used to aid automated identification of a shape in an image when information about the motion is significant in its description. There are currently two established versions of velocity moments: Cartesian and Zernike.

Cartesian velocity moments

Cartesian moments for single images 
A Cartesian moment of a single image is calculated by

Cartesian velocity moments for sequences of images 
Cartesian velocity moments are based on these Cartesian moments. A Cartesian velocity moment  is defined by

 is taken from Central moments, added so the equation is translation invariant, defined as

 introduces velocity into the equation as

After the Cartesian velocity moment is calculated, it can be normalised by

Now the value is not affected by the number of images in the sequence or the size of the object.

As Cartesian moments are non-orthogonal, so are Cartesian velocity moments, so different moments can be closely correlated. These velocity moments do however provide translation and scale invariance (unless the scale changes within the sequence of images).

Zernike velocity moments

Zernike moments for single images 
A Zernike moment of a single image is calculated by

 is derived from Zernike polynomials and is defined by

Zernike velocity moments for sequences of images 
Zernike velocity moments are based on these Zernike moments. A Zernike velocity moment  is defined by

Like the Cartesian velocity moments, Zernike velocity moments can be normalised by

As Zernike velocity moments are based on the orthogonal Zernike moments, they produce less correlated and more compact descriptions than Cartesian velocity moments. Zernike velocity moments also provide translation and scale invariance (even when the scale changes within the sequence).

Comparison of methods

References

External links 
CVonline Velocity Moments page

Motion in computer vision
Applications of computer vision